Mostafa Mohsin Montu (born 2 February 1945) is a Bangladeshi politician and former Member of Parliament. He is the Incumbent Secretary General of Gano Forum.

Early life
Montu was born on 2 February 1945 at Dhanmondi in Dhaka of the then British Raj to Mir Jahan and Rahela Khatun.

Career
Montu was involved in Bangladesh Awami League politics from his student life. Later, he was elected President of Jubo League, youth wing of Awami League. He was the Secretary of Awami League's Dhaka City branch. He was expelled from Awami League in 1992 and  joined Kamal Hossain's Gano Forum. In 2009, he was elected Secretary General of Gano Forum.

Montu was elected a member of parliament from the Dhaka-3 constituency as an Awami League candidate during the third parliamentary election in 1986. In the fifth parliamentary elections in 1991, he contested again from Dhaka-3 under Awami League banner but he was defeated by BNP's Amanullah Aman.

References

1945 births
Living people
People from Dhaka
Awami League politicians
Gano Forum politicians
3rd Jatiya Sangsad members